Guam is a two-party presidential representative democracy, in which the Governor is the head of government. Guam is an organized, unincorporated territory of the United States, with policy relations between Guam and the US under the jurisdiction of the Office of Insular Affairs.

Background
The economic situation in Guam is currently dependent on the significant U.S. military presence there. Its status as a tourist destination for Japanese, Singaporeans and South Koreans also contributes to Guam's economy, as well as economic migrants from the Philippines working at lower-wage jobs in the hospitality industry.

Maintenance of the status quo vis-à-vis the current political relationship between the territory and the United States is controversial. There is a significant movement in favor of the Territory becoming a commonwealth, which would give it a political status similar to Puerto Rico and the Northern Mariana Islands. Competing movements exist, which advocate political independence from the United States, statehood, or a combination with the Northern Mariana Islands as a single territory (not necessarily commonwealth). These proposals, however, are not seen as favorable by the U.S. federal government, which argues Guam does not have the financial stability or self-sufficiency to warrant such status. They cite Guam's increasing reliance on Federal spending as evidence, and question how commonwealth status or statehood would benefit the United States as a whole.

A portion of the people on Guam favors a modified version of the current Territorial status, involving greater autonomy from the federal government (similar to the autonomy of individual States).  Perceived indifference by the U.S. Congress regarding a change-of-status petition submitted by Guam has led many to feel that the territory is being deprived of the benefits of a more equitable union with the United States. Guam is also listed on the United Nations list of non-self-governing territories.

Political parties and elections

See also
Political party strength in Guam

External links
Guam Residents Organize Against US Plans for $15B Military Buildup on Pacific Island - video report by Democracy Now!